The following is a list of characters seen in the American animated television series Frisky Dingo.

Major characters

Killface
Killface (real name Evelyn) (voiced by Adam Reed) is a main character of Frisky Dingo. A muscular, maniacal supervillain, Killface is an alien with pale white skin, red eyes, a skull-like face, and feet resembling huge clawed talons. He talks with a British accent. Killface does not wear clothes, nor does he appear to possess external genitalia, despite having a son, Simon. He has superhuman healing abilities, having once survived most of his chest being blown away as well as surviving from a pipe jutting out of his lung (Which he uses to kill a seemingly incompetent doctor).

Killface has constructed the Annihilatrix, a rocket device designed to propel the Earth directly into the sun.  However, having spent twenty billion dollars developing the Annihilatrix, Killface has insufficient funds for a media buy with which to market his global takeover.

He is revealed to be a member of an alien race, charged with destroying Earth by his mother; surprisingly, the other members of his species - like his son, Simon - are fully clothed, making his nakedness an enduring mystery.

Xander Crews / Awesome X / Barnaby Jones

Xander Crews (voiced by Adam Reed), whose alternate identity is the superhero Awesome X, is the 33-year-old billionaire owner of Crews Enterprises. By the time of the series, Awesome X and his team of high-tech armored soldiers, the Xtacles, have effectively eliminated the supervillain threat, making superheroes unnecessary.  Awesome X and the Xtacles are headquartered in a Low Orbiting Hovership, the Xcaliber, which costs Crews Enterprises five million dollars a year to maintain, and with no supervillains for them to fight, Stan, Crews's second-in-command and head of the Crews Enterprise Board of Directors, wants to downsize.  He announces Awesome X's retirement, unbeknownst to Crews, who prefers to play superhero and waste money on his own entertainment.

Crews is also the very proud owner of Train Island, and has been featured in two adult films during his more lean pecuniary years: "Head of the Ass" and "Check Me Out, I Suck". For the former film, Crews participated in the award-winning documentary "The Making of Head of the Ass: The Documentary about the Porno".

Xander Crews has a third identity, Barnaby Jones, which he makes up so that he can trick Killface into being his best friend after Killface is blinded. This is necessary because at the time Xander Crews befriends Killface using the new Barnaby Jones identity, Stan has taken over Crews Enterprises and the Xtacles have turned against him and tried to kill him, and all of his money is gone, too, leaving him with nothing (in fact, he goes around naked as Barnaby Jones because he doesn't even have any clothes at this point). He maintains this fake identity until shortly after Killface bites his ear off in a fight to the death in Chinatown, after which time he returns to his original Xander Crews identity in order to reclaim his billionaire fortune, his title as CEO of Crews Enterprises, and his title as Awesome-X.

Simon

Simon (voiced by Christian Danley)  is the son of Killface. He is an emotionally unstable, gangsta-rap listening, overweight, blond-haired child version of Killface who mumbles unintelligibly when he speaks.  He enjoys eating Cap'n Crump brand cereal endorsed by his favorite rapper Taqu'il, although he often ends up smashing the bowl on the floor in a show of adolescent defiance.

It is stated in the episode "The Miracle" that Simon is gay, and his apparent boyfriend is the LARPing hobbit Bobo T. Baggins. However, a later episode has Simon telling his father that he lied about being gay to spoil Killface's presidential aspirations.

Stan

Stan (voiced by Stuart Culpepper) is the no-nonsense head of the board of Crews Enterprises and runs the day-to-day operations of the company in Xander Crews' absence, or when Xander just doesn't care enough to come to the office. In the first season, Stan is one of the few people to know Awesome X's secret identity.  The rest of the Board of Directors consists of flesh-eating clones of Stan who only communicate by saying "HARUMPH!".  When Crews is believed to be dead, Stan takes over the identity of Awesome X for his own purposes.  He later wins election as the Vice President of the United States, as Ta'quil's running mate, after Killface and Crews are found to be ineligible to be President, due to not being from Earth and old enough, respectively.  After Ta'quil dies in the series finale of Frisky Dingo, Stan is shown as the new President in the Xtacles spinoff.

Sinn / Hooper

Sinn (voiced by Kelly Jenrette) is Killface's sexy female servant.  She has a mechanical arm, replacing the one that Killface ripped off, and her speech has an electronic affect.  Sinn is romantically involved with Arthur, and often refers to Killface as "Sire."

When Killface fires Sinn, replacing her with "Barnaby Jones" (Xander Crews), she joins the Xtacles under the alias of Hooper. The Xtacles are attracted to her, and she used this to control the group which is renamed the Deceptacles.  She also forms an evil alliance with Antagonie, Dread Lobster and Valerie. She is shot to death by Valerie after attempting to have sex with her.

Grace Ryan / Antagone

Grace Ryan (voiced by Kate Miller) is a television reporter who often covers Awesome X's battles. Grace considers herself to be Xander's girlfriend and desperately wants to bear his children, although Xander takes their relationship much less seriously and does his best to break things off with her. Grace is unaware that Xander is secretly Awesome X.

Grace often proves to be pushy, obnoxious, clingy and self-idolizing, to the point where even her news crew wishes for her death.  Despite Xander's attitude toward her, and her cheating on him once, Grace remains fanatically devoted to him, even freezing some of his semen without his knowledge, which she later uses to impregnate herself. When she falls into a barrel full of super-intelligent radioactive ants, the ants inhabit her brain and Grace frequently becomes "Antagone", a criminal mastermind; after Xander rejects her marriage proposal, Ryan becomes Antagone permanently and is bent on killing Crews. As Antagone, she is killed by her own mutated child, who devours her head upon birth.

Arthur Watley / The Dread Lobster

Arthur Watley (voiced by Scott Lipe) is an intern at Crews' Company and inventor of the Antfarm Keyboard, Arthur Watley was the object of Xander's initial idea for making a new villain, "The Dread Lobster," a half-man, half-lobster; his hands are removed and replaced by giant crustacean claws. At first, Watley's body rejects the claws, but he pulls through and begins to change into a giant crab. Watley started out as the Crews Company accountant, but later took refuge underneath the sea, leaving behind a heartbroken Sinn, until Anatagone fishes him out to recruit him as a fellow villain. Watley first pursues a romantic relationship with Sinn but is rejected when she instead falls for Val. He then falls in love with Antagone, but he is soon beheaded by Wendell in a fit of jealousy.  Afterward, his body is cooked and eaten by the Deceptacles (formerly known as the Xtacles).

The Xtacles / Deceptacles

The Xtacles (voiced by Lucky Yates) are Awesome-X's band of hetero-questionable, death prone, excitable, mercenary super soldiers.  They see Awesome-X as a cool, friendly boss and are eager to please him. They are extremely violent and tend to have a high mortality rate. Although individual members of the group are often referred to by name (Mike, Fat Mike, New Fat Mike, Clint, Cliff, etc.), the Xtacles tend to have very similar (or often the same) voice. The Xtacles also have a tendency to be easily distracted from their objectives, and are very prone to suggestion. Their trademark catchphrase is the exclamation "Boosh!"

All the Xtacles have a remote-controlled explosive device in their helmets, which Stan later uses to blackmail them into finding Xander Crews when he goes missing. At first Xander does not realize that they are men in power armor and instead believes them to be robots. This unfortunately results in one of their deaths when he tries to take him apart and power him on in a flashback during season two. Multiple characters assume control of the Xtacles at various times, including Stan, Sinn, and Valerie. The Xtacles change their name to the "Deceptacles", and begin wearing black armor instead of red, when Sinn takes command. During this period they also create a theme song for themselves that parodies the Transformers theme -- "Deceptacles!  More than you bargained for!"

Ronnie

Ronnie (voiced by Adam Reed) is an Xtacle of ambiguous sexuality who speaks with a heavy Slavic accent. He has a homoerotic fixation with Xander Crews. The Xtacles commonly refer to Ronnie's desire to rape. Ronnie spends the majority of his screen time pantless as the bottom half of his armored suit was stolen by Xander Crews when he attempted to rape him. In a bit of cruel irony, Ronnie was horrifically crushed from the waist down by a gigantic pair of Haggar pants in episode 208 after saving Xander's and Wendell's lives. He uses the final seconds of his life wishing he had seen Hannah Montana, and then rapidly bleeds to death once the pants are lifted off of him.

Wendell T. Stamps / Wendell X / Steve from Machete Squad

Wendell T. Stamps (voiced by Adam Reed) Claims to formerly be a member of the Department of Labor, on loan from the CIA, which neither confirms nor denies Wendell's involvement, investigating Torpedo Vegas' underground rabbit fights.  He later becomes part of the Secret Service and Killface's main bodyguard during his campaign for the Presidency. Wendell tends to kill needlessly, killing a man out of retaliation for the supposed murder of his then partner, Cody, whom he then frames for the murder when he finds he's alive, killing a pharmacist for threatening to call the police on him, and killing Arthur when he tries to marry Antagone. At one point, he claims to be a racist.

Taqu'il

Taqu'il alternatively spelled T'aquil, Ta'quil, or Taq'uil (voiced by Killer Mike) is a world-famous rapper whose videos are, apparently, in heavy rotation.  He was Killface's presidential running mate, helping gain votes by assuring black people that Killface will eventually be assassinated, making him president. He does spend some time as president. He is eaten alive by the creature known as Cody 2, when he willingly jumps into its mouth while holding a bomb, leaving the creature unfazed and everybody curious to what his plan was.

Mr. Ford 
Mr. Ford is an affable, bald-headed, older black gentleman with a fast, marble-mouthed manner of speech. This, combined with his short-tempered intolerance for all who do not understand him directly, makes Mr. Ford a difficult character to comprehend and abide. He is, however, a straightforward communicator, able to say whatever is on his mind; and able to say it with impunity to whomsoever he is speaking. In consequence, his comments are often blunt, inappropriate, but honest and direct.

Mr. Ford takes on many jobs throughout the series, beginning as a pet-shop owner, then moving up the vocational ladder to become a gun-shop owner. It is through this pursuit that we witness, (in flashback), a younger, afro-sporting Mr. Ford working as an attendant in a hospital caring for mentally disabled children. Mr. Ford's penultimate job is working as the Secretary for Homeland Security; his ultimate job would be the job that followed, serving as America's Commander-in-Chief.

Through the questionable auspices of a "corrupt Supreme Court," and, "more specifically, a corrupt Stephen Breyer," the character Taqu'il becomes America's first black president, and thereby appoints Mr. Ford to the position of Secretary for Homeland Security. Only following the ostensible deaths of President Taqu'il and his entire cabinet aboard Air Force One, as well as the unfortunate ant-poisonings of the House Speaker and President pro tempore of the United States Senate, does Secretary Ford become the second Mr. Ford - - the first being Gerald Ford - - to become President of the United States.

We know that Mr. Ford is fond of the ladies, fond of golf, and concerned with "Double-keggers" or "Doppelgängers," or, perhaps, both. He comments upon his own ubiquity within the series thus: My ass is everywhere. The character, and his catchphrase, would make a cameo appearance years later in an episode entitled "Drift Problem," (Season 3, Episode 7), from the animated series Archer; also created by Adam Reed.

The character "Mr. Ford" is voiced by a "Mr. Ford".

Valerie

Valerie commonly referred to as Val (voiced by Amber Nash) spends time as the high-strung, abused assistant to Killface. Angered at and possibly insane from the abuse, she tries to kill Killface and Xander Crews many times. She also bought Ronnie's robot pants from Simon, which she used to escape after one of her failed assassination attempts.  Along with Sinn and Antagone, she establishes the short lived "Sisterhood of Chaos" which quickly took control of both the Decepticles and the Annihilatrix.  However Valerie soon became tired of sharing power and kills Sinn (after briefly seducing her as a lesbian), wears her bullet proof Decepticles armor and attempts to kill Antagone. She gains the Annihilatrix key and GPS, but loses her short lived leadership of the Decepticles.

Nerds

The nerds are three geeks that are obsessed with things like Dungeons & Dragons, Star Trek, and Live Action Role-Playing Games (LARPing). They are always seen costumed respectively as a halfling (Bobo T. Baggins), a knight (Steve), and a wizard (Kevin).

While preparing for Larpstock, the nerds meet Xander Crews when Ronnie's Xtacle pants ran out of power and Xander falls from the sky onto their gazebo. They agree to drive Xander around and all three nerds are beaten up by Antagone. The nerds meet Nearl's corpse when it falls from the sky onto the same gazebo, and they later throw him off of a building. From nearby, Valerie shoots Kevin dead with a sniper rifle.

In an homage to Weird Science, the two remaining nerds try to bring Nearl back to life. While filming a Larp video, Steve captures Xander's campaign jet as it crashes into the ground because of Simon's missile attack. Bobo is a homosexual who has dated Simon, and is responsible for the RPG missile attack on Killface, having received the weapon from Simon on a blind date, he is misled by a photoshopped picture of Simon's head on his father's body. Mr. Ford later uses the same launcher to shoot down Air Force One with Stan and President Taqu'il on board. Bobo also received the Annihilatrix spare coupling from Simon, and gave it to Wendell in exchange for performing a sexual favour. Killface threatens Bobo into revealing the whereabouts of the spare coupling and throws Bobo into his bedroom afterwards.

Minor characters

Nearl Crews/ Nearl The Local Retarded Wino Guy

Nearl is a mentally disabled homeless man whose eyes Killface and Xander Crews tried to steal. He is later used as a substitute for Xander Crews by the Xtacles, who learn that he is in fact the long lost twin brother of Xander Crews, forced to live in a mental hospital by his parents, who preferred to think of him as dead. Nearl is then left on the street after the hospital becomes defunct. After having his mental disability treated with "brain chemical", he swears revenge against Xander by threatening to kill him, but is soon shot in the back of the head by Ronnie the Xtacle to prevent the series from becoming any more complicated. The corpse is then found by the three nerds of the previous episode, the last two attempt to reanimate it. Like Xander, Nearl is voiced by Adam Reed.

Hooker

Hooker is a prostitute that discovers Xander is Awesome X. She parlays this into becoming a millionaire and stealing his mansion and, at one point, robs Wendell with the help of an Albino woman. She and Old Spice become a couple.

Trent and Brent

Trent and Brent (voiced by Brendon Small) are twins who are kidnapped by Killface to help promote the destructive power of the Annihilatrix. Both attended USC Film School and became victims of Killface's murderous rages after loud mouthing him about the failing marketing strategies.

Old Spice

Old Spice is an elderly man from China. He helps Killface and Crews escape from a sweatshop. Xander hires him as an advisor. Old Spice betrays Xander to live in his mansion with 'Hooker'.

In the first season, Old Spice's lines in Mandarin are correctly subtitled. However, in the second season, Mandarin lines are sampled from first-season episodes with new, incorrect subtitles.

Darcelle Jones

Darcelle Jones is a beloved and adored female African-American star reporter for Team Jaguar News. Grace openly hates her, thinking (correctly) that Darcelle is out to steal her glory. Later Jones seemingly perishes in a plane crash along with the rest of Team Jaguar.

Baby Lamont 
Baby Lamont is a penguin that was trapped on an ice floe, and became the poster child for global warming. Lamont's gender is never revealed, but it is assumed he is a male penguin. Lamont is intelligent and can understand human speech.

After accidentally curing global warming, Killface adopts Baby Lamont to be his animal mascot for the presidential campaign. Killface accredits most of his popularity to Baby Lamont's support. Lamont is frequently chirping and can only be silenced by being fed a fish. Taqu'il torments Lamont constantly, and Killface alternates between treating Lamont nice or mean. Killface gets upset at the Haggar Pants Debate after Carter Hawkins reveals that Killface isn't qualified to run for presidency, due to not even being an earth citizen, let alone a U.S. citizen. Baby Lamont is "accidentally" crushed to death when Killface uses him in a strong upper-cut that breaks Xander Crews' neck. The death is what fuels Killface to resume his plans for world destruction.

Torpedo Vegas

Torpedo Vegas (voiced by Mike Schatz) is a gangster who organizes illegal sporting events such as "death rabbit" fights in Chinatown. He kidnaps Killface's son but lets him go when impressed by his father's sense of character.

Dottie Bunch

Dottie Bunch is Killface's presidential campaign manager. It is implied that she has helped several politicians succeed in the past, and she has inside information on some of America's leaders. She is a heavy smoker and often spends Killface's campaign money on expensive, imported vodka,  earning much of Killface's contempt as a result. She has been known to make obscene advances on Wendell, but spends more time insulting him. She is a spin-doctor and turns Killface's missteps into good publicity.

Dottie proposed and convinced Killface to make Taqu'il his running mate. She and the entire election team are nearly killed from Bobo's errant missile, but fortunately Killface's chest absorbed most of the explosion. Dottie is still injured, receiving a broken arm and her hair starts to fall out. In a flashback, she is accidentally shot while presenting Killface's new campaign advertisement to an Xtacles focussing group that degenerated due to bad grape soda (Killing a female job coach in the process), but apparently Dottie made a full recovery. After Killface was unprepared for an upcoming presidential debate, Dottie berates him and throws a barb about the failed Annihilatrix and Killface's refusal to read her talking points. Killface feels insulted and angrily shoots Dottie in the head, killing her instantly. Killface then humorously sees this as a reminder to fix the Annihilatrix.

Simone

Simone is a homeless prostitute and a heroin addict. Her speech is slurred and incomprehensible, probably because of her heavy drug use. Her lack of breasts, masculine build, 'front bulge', and the fact that she probably sodomized Xander Crews at some point prior to meeting his daughter suggest that s/he is a transvestite or transsexual.

Xander meets Simone in the year after the Annihilatrix cured global warming, when Xander is living on the streets. Simone is hired as the secretary for Xander's Outreach Center, based out of a cardboard box, and becomes employee of the month. At one point, Xander mistakes Simone for dead and leaves her in a dumpster. To get an IOU on a sexual favour, Wendell trades Simone with Ronnie's old pair of Xtacle pants; with thus become Simone's Kickin' Pants. Simone is last seen being questioned by Valerie, where Simone asks "Do you wanna take a dump in my mouth?"  This causes Val to jet boot away.

Simone made a cameo appearance in Archer season 6 episode 7, "Nellis."

Philip Mazzone
Phillip Mazzone (Phil) (voiced by Mike Bell) appears early in the series and is the apparent Program Manager of the Annihilatrix. He is a pudgy, bald-headed, Jason Alexander-type, with a distinct lack of ethical propriety. His proximity to the Annihilatrix during its construction has given him cancer, a condition which his wife, Lorraine, cannot abide as she kicks Phil out of his house after hearing his diagnosis. This forces Phil to move in with his employer, Killface, even though he is suing him for his condition.

Unable to settle with Phil, Killface's assets are frozen and ultimately turned over to him. Phil then sells the principal asset, the Annihilatrix, for $20,000,000,000, and then pays Killface a visit with complementary pickles. There, an attempted Vitoxin (ochrocarpus longifolius) poisoning fails to kill Phil, as he has made himself immune to the contaminant through incremental self-dosing. Then, on the Killface patio, the now less-fat and cancer-free Phil is shot through the head by Valerie, who is aiming for Killface.

Harper Ellis

Harper Ellis is the "suspiciously handsome" pundit representing the left-wing on the "Carter Hawkins Show".  The character is based on - and voiced by - Ellis Henican.

Cody 2

Cody 2 is a gigantic, soft-skinned white mutant as tall and wide as the Annihilatrix. At birth he was the size of an overweight child, but quickly grew exponentially into a huge monster. He is the half-human, half-ant offspring of Antagone and Xander Crews via artificial self-insemination. "His" gender is unknown; it is implied that "he" is male because Wendell names him Cody 2, after his former partner. Cody 2 is extremely intelligent and seems to understand Wendell's talking.

After birth, Cody 2's first act was to kill an exhausted Antagone by biting her head off. (Likely a reference to Alien: Resurrection wherein a hybrid alien baby is born and immediately kills its mother.) Wendell quickly tamed Cody 2 with a belt and setting boundaries and began to ride Cody 2 around the Town. After several stops, Cody 2 and Wendell reached the Annihilatrix and attack several main characters there. Ta'quil, armed with some sort-of machine, jumps into Cody 2's mouth and is swallowed whole, without harming the creature. A spaceship carrying several of Killface's species arrives. It shoots Cody 2 several times, and he dies, leaving a depressed Wendell.

Ashley

Ashley is the negligent secretary of Xander Crews. She frequently informs him of meetings and calls that are several minutes late, and at one point is noted as not even being on-site. Although she is never seen on-screen, her name can be seen on Xander's phone many times throughout the series as she does her job, rather poorly.

Carter Hawkins

Carter Hawkins is the host of the right-wing pundit show "Carter Hawkins Show."  Through the run of Season 2 he is shown moderating the presidential debate, eventually informing both candidates that neither of them are eligible to run. Hawkins is a take on American cable news pundits in the vein of Chris Matthews and Glenn Beck.

Jack Taggart

Jack Taggart (voiced by Marshall Bell) The main character of The Xtacles spinoff, Jack Taggart is the former leader of the Xtacles, and currently the acting leader. His armor has silver shoulder and forearm parts, differentiating him from the other Xtacles. He also has a scar over his right eye, the origin of which is unexplained. He is suicidally loyal to Awesome X.

A.L.E.X.

A.L.E.X. (voiced by Rachael Harris) is the Xcalibur's holographic computer. She takes the form of a blond woman in a skin-tight blue suit, though it has been shown that she can change her form. A.L.E.X. is the voice of reason to the usually impulsive and idiotic Xtacles, though she is rarely listened to.

References

External links
Killface's profile on MySpace
Xander's profile on MySpace
Simon's profile on MySpace
Ta'Quil's profile on MySpace
Article About Simon's Rabbit Fights on GNN

Frisky Dingo